Extremadura Unión Deportiva Femenino, formerly known as CF Puebla Extremadura and later as Extremadura Femenino CF, was a Spanish women football club from Almendralejo.

History
Extremadura Femenino was founded in Puebla de la Calzada, Badajoz in 1995 as Club de Fútbol Femenino Puebla. It won the national championship in 2000, beating AD Torrejón in the final, and it was the runner-up in 1999 in 2002, second to CD Oroquieta and Levante UD. CFF Puebla also reached the national cup's final in 2001 and 2005, but lost both times to Levante.

Also known as Club Irex Puebla for sponsorship reasons from 2005, the team gradually declined through the 2000s, and suffering from financial strain in 2008 it merged with AD Las Mercedes to form Extremadura FCF, moving to Almendralejo. In the 2008–09 season the team collapsed, ending second to last in the table and being thus relegated. With the championship's expansion for the following season Extremadura applied for a place in 2009 and 2010, but it was denied it both times. Several of its former players played in the premier championship for SPC Llanos de Olivenza, which took its place as Extremadura's powerhouse.

On 15 July 2017, Extremadura Femenino would be integrated into the structure of Extremadura UD. In 2020, the partnership ended and the club returned to their previous name of Extremadura Femenino CF.

Season by season

Current squad

Honours

As Puebla
 División de Honor (1)
 2000

References

External links
 Official website

Women's football clubs in Spain
Association football clubs established in 1995
Football clubs in Extremadura
Extremadura UD